UOP is an initialism that may stand for the following:
 Ukroboronprom, a Ukrainian defence company
 University of Ottawa Press, publishing house
 University of Patras, in Patras, Greece
 University of Peloponnese, recently founded in Tripoli, Greece
 University of Pennsylvania, an Ivy League college in Philadelphia, Pennsylvania
 University of Peradeniya in Sri Lanka
 University of Peshawar, in Peshawar, Pakistan
 University of Petra, in Amman, Jordan
 University of Phoenix, for-profit educational institution specializing in adult education with online and ground classes
 University of Plymouth, in South Devon, England
 University of Portsmouth, in Hampshire
 University of Pretoria, South Africa
 University of Pune in India
 University of the Pacific (United States), in Stockton, California
 University of the Pacific (Peru), in Peru
 UOP LLC, (formerly Universal Oil Products), a company developing and delivering oil-related technology to the major manufacturing industries
 Uranus Orbiter and Probe, a proposal to study Uranus and its moons
 Urząd Ochrony Państwa, Polish Intelligence agency
 User operation prohibition, function in commercial DVDs that prohibits user operation at certain times during playback (such as while a copyright notice is displayed)
 uop can be a way to spell μop or Micro-operation in computing, using a u to represent the Greek letter mu